Ramna is a commune in Caraș-Severin County, western Romania with a population of 1782 people. It is composed of three villages: Bărbosu (Barbos), Ramna, and Valeapai (Valéapáj).

References

Communes in Caraș-Severin County
Localities in Romanian Banat